Hou Yingchao (born 15 June 1980) is a Chinese table tennis player who plays a chopping style.

Association change
In 2018, Hou registered with Table Tennis Canada and played in the ITTF World Tour under Canada's flag. He did so to continue playing in ITTF tournaments, without having acquired Canadian nationality or giving up his Chinese nationality. Indeed, a year later he played in the 2019 All China Table Tennis Championships, and by beating Wang Chuqin 4–0 in the final, he became the tournament's oldest ever champion. He first won the tournament in 2000.

References

1980 births
Living people
Chinese male table tennis players
Table tennis players from Beijing
Universiade medalists in table tennis
Universiade silver medalists for China
Universiade bronze medalists for China
Kinoshita Meister Tokyo players
Chinese expatriate sportspeople in Russia
Chinese expatriate sportspeople in Japan
Chinese emigrants to Canada
Expatriate table tennis people in Japan
Medalists at the 2007 Summer Universiade